Strauss, Strauß or Straus is a common Germanic surname. Outside Germany and Austria Strauß is always spelled Strauss (the letter "ß" is not used in the German-speaking part of Switzerland). In classical music, "Strauss" usually refers to Richard Strauss or Johann Strauss II.

The name has been used by families in the Germanic area for at least a thousand years. The overlord of Gröna, for example, went by the name of Struz and used the image of an ostrich as his symbol. Examples of it could still be seen on the thousand-year-old church bell of that town. "Struz" or "Strutz" is the North-German form of the word "Strauss", which is the modern German word for ostrich.

Some of the earliest Jewish bearers of the name hailed from the Judengasse in medieval Frankfurt, where families have been known by the name of the houses they inhabited. All the houses had names and these included Haus Strauss, complete with an image of an ostrich on the façade.

When, for tax purposes, Napoleon made surnames obligatory in 1808, some more Jewish families decided to adopt the Straus(s) name.

Notable people

A–F
 Adolf Strauss (general) (or Strauß 1879–1973), German colonel general
 Adriaan Strauss (born 1985), South African Springbok rugby union player
 Andrew Strauss (born 1977), South African born former English cricket captain
 Andries Strauss (born 1984), South African Springbok rugby union player; brother of Irish International Richardt Strauss and cousin of Springbok Adriaan Strauss
 Annette Strauss (1924–1998), philanthropist and former mayor of Dallas, Texas
 Anselm Strauss (1916–1996), American sociologist
 Anton Strauss (born 1858),  German-Russian engineer, inventor and entrepreneur
 Astrid Strauss (born 1968), East German swimmer
 Aurora Straus, American racecar driver
 Barry S. Strauss (born 1953), American classicist and historian
 Bill Strauss (footballer) (1916–1984), South African born Scottish footballer and cricketer
 Billy Straus, American record producer and songwriter
 Botho Strauß (born 1944), German writer and playwright
 Bruce Strauss (born 1952), American boxer
 Carolyn Strauss (born 1963), American television executive and producer
 Christoph Straus (around 1580–1631), composer
 Claude Lévi-Strauss (1908–2009), French anthropologist
 D. F. M. Strauss (born 1946), South African philosopher
 Darin Strauss (born 1970), American writer
 David Strauss (David Friedrich Strauss or Strauß, 1808–1874), German theologian and writer 
 Dominique Strauss-Kahn (born 1949), French politician, former managing director of the International Monetary Fund
 Dona Strauss (born 1934), British mathematician
 Donald B. Straus (1916–2007), American educator, author, political advisor
 Eduard Strauss (1835–1916), Austrian composer, son of Johann Strauss I
 Eric Strauss (born 1960), American biologist, professor at Boston College
 Ernst G. Straus (1922–1983), mathematician and assistant to Albert Einstein
 Erwin Straus (1891–1975), phenomenologist and neurologist of European origin
 Fabio Strauss (born 1994), Austrian footballer
 Ferdinand Strauss, The founder of the mechanical toy industry in America
 Franz Josef Strauss (or Strauß, 1915–1988), German politician (CSU)
 Franz Strauss (1822–1905), German horn player and composer, father of Richard Strauss

G–L
 Harry L. Straus, (1896–1949), American electrical engineer, horse and cattle breeder, sportsman, entrepreneur and computer pioneer
 Harry Strauss (1909–1941), contract killer for Murder, Inc. in the 1930s
 Henry Strauss, 1st Baron Conesford (1892–1974), member of the British Parliament from 1935 to 1955
 Hugo Strauß (1907–1941), German rower
 Isaac Lobe Straus (1871–1946), American politician and lawyer
 Isidor Straus (1845–1912), owner of R. H. Macy Co., member of the U.S. House of Representatives, died when the steamer Titanic sank
 Ivan Štraus (born 1928), Bosnian architect
 Jack Straus (1930–1988), American professional poker player
 Jael Strauss, contestant in America's Next Top Model, Cycle 8
 James Straus, American special effects artist and animation developer 
 James Strauss (flautist) (born 1974), Brazilian flautist
 James D. Strauss (1929–2014), American theologian and professor
 Jesse I. Straus (1872–1936), son of Isidor Straus, president of Macy's, U.S. ambassador to France 1933–36
 Jessica Straus (born 1962), American voice actress 
 Jo-Ann Strauss (born 1981), Miss South Africa in 2000
 Joe Straus (born 1959), politician from Texas
 Joe Strauss (1858–1906), American baseball player
 Johann Strauss I (1804–1849), Austrian composer (Radetzky March), father of Johann Strauss II, Josef Strauss, and Eduard Strauss
 Johann Strauss II (1825–1899), Austrian composer (Die Fledermaus, Blue Danube Waltz)
 Johann Strauss III (1866–1939), Austrian composer, son of Eduard Strauss
 John J. Strauss (born 1957), American producer and writer of film and television
 Jon Strauss, former president of Harvey Mudd College
 Josef Strauss (1827–1870), Austrian composer, son of Johann Strauss I
 Joseph Straus (born 1938), German patent scholar
 Joseph Strauss (disambiguation), several people, including:
 Joseph Strauss (admiral) (1861–1948), American admiral
 Joseph Strauss (engineer) (1870–1938), chief engineer in the building of the Golden Gate Bridge in California
 Josh Strauss (born 1986), South African rugby union player
 Julius Strauss, British journalist
 Julius Strauss (photographer) (1857–1924), American photographer
 Kai Strauss (born 1970), German electric blues singer, guitarist, and songwriter
 Karin Straus (born 1971), Dutch politician
 Karl Strauss (1912–2006), German-American master brewer and co-founder of Karl Strauss Brewing Company
 Kathleen N. Straus (born 1923), American educator and politician
 Kim Strauss (or Kurt Strauss) (born 1953), actor
 Jacobus Gideon Nel Strauss (1900–1990), aka Koos Strauss, Kosie Strauss, J. G. N. Strauss, South African politician and Leader of the opposition after Jan Smuts
 Leo Strauss (1899–1973), political philosopher
 Levi Strauss (disambiguation), several people, including:
 Levi Strauss (1829–1902), Bavaria-born American entrepreneur and inventor of blue jeans
 Claude Lévi-Strauss, French anthropologist and ethnologist
 Dina Lévi-Strauss, French anthropologist and ethnologist, wife of the above
 Lewis Strauss (1896–1974) American businessman and chairman of the United States Atomic Energy Commission
 Lotte Strauss (1913–1985), American pathologist after which Churg–Strauss syndrome is named
 Ludwig Straus (1835–1899), Hungarian-Austrian violinist

M–Z
 Maayan Strauss (born 1983), Israeli artist
 Marianne Strauss (1923–1996), German Holocaust survivor
 Mark L. Strauss, New Testament professor
 Mark Strauss (journalist) (born 1966), American journalist
 Michael W. Straus (1897–1970), American government official
 Mikaela Straus (born 1998), stage name King Princess, American singer-songwriter and great-great-granddaughter of Isidor and Ida Straus
 Murray A. Straus (1926–2016),  American sociologist and professor (University of New Hampshire), creator of the Conflict tactics scale
 Nathan Straus (1848–1931), German-American merchant and philanthropist
 Nathan Straus Jr. (1889–1961), New York journalist and politician
 Neil Strauss, (born 1969) American journalist and author
 Ofra Strauss (born 1960), chairperson of Israeli food products manufacturer Strauss
 Oscar Straus (composer) (1870–1954), Austrian composer of operettas
 Oscar Straus (politician) (1850–1926), Secretary of Commerce and Labor under President Theodore Roosevelt
 Paul Strauss (born 1964), politician from the District of Columbia
 Peter Strauss (born 1947), American actor
 Ralph Straus Regula (1924–2017), politician from Beach City, Stark County, Ohio
 Ray Strauss (1927–2013), Australian cricketer
Richard Strauss (1864–1949), German composer of operas and tone poems (Salome, Also sprach Zarathustra)
 Richard Strauss (physician) (1938–2005), subject of the Ohio State University abuse scandal
 Richardt Strauss (born 1986), South African rugby union player representing Ireland internationally; brother of Springbok Andries Strauss and cousin of Springbok Adriaan Strauss
 Robert Schwarz Strauss (1918–2014), American diplomat
 Robert Strauß (born 1986), German football player
 Robert Strauss (actor) (1913–1975), American actor
 Robert E Strauss (born 1983), American professional wrestler using the ring name Robbie E
Roberto Strauss (born 1952), Mexican Olympic swimmer
 Roger Williams Straus Jr. (1917–2004), co-founder of book publishers Farrar, Straus and Giroux
 Rolene Strauss (born 1992), 2014 Miss South Africa and Miss World
 Sagi Strauss (born 1976), Israeli footballer
 Stephen Straus (1946–2007), American medical researcher
 Sylvia Straus, pianist
 Thomas Strauß (born 1953), German rower
 Tiaan Strauss (born 1965),  South African Springbok rugby union player
 Victoria Strauss (born 1955), fantasy author
 Walter Alexander Strauss (born 1937), American mathematician
 William Strauss, (1947–2007), American author, historian, playwright, lecturer and theorist
 William M. Straus, (born 1956), member of the Massachusetts House of Representatives
 Zoe Strauss, (born 1970), American photographer

Places and institutions named Strauss or Strauß or Straus

 Karl Strauss Brewing Company, a San Diego-based Craft Beer Company
 Levi Strauss & Co., an American Clothing Company.
 Strauss Airfield, Airfield in Australia, named for American fighter pilot Allison W. Strauss
 Straus Clothing, a former clothing retailer in North Dakota
 Strauss Group Ltd, a food products manufacturer in Israel
 Strauss, an unincorporated community in Labette County, Kansas

Fictional Strauss characters
 Mrs Strauss, an elderly client of Jimmy McGill whom he assists with estate planning in the Better Call Saul episode titled "Alpine Shepherd Boy"
 Akabara Strauss, Vampire King from the manga The Record of a Fallen Vampire
 Dr Arthur Strauss, fictional character who served as the original mentor of serial killer and cult leader Joe Carroll, lead character in the TV series The Following
 Artie Strauss, fictional character based on the real life murderer Richard Loeb of the infamous murder duo Leopold and Loeb
 Erin Strauss, fictional FBI section chief played by Jayne Atkinson in the TV series Criminal Minds
 Hans and Greta Strauss, inspiration for the fairy tale of "Hansel and Gretel" according to the Buffy episode "Gingerbread"
 Justice Strauss, fictional character from A Series of Unfortunate Events by Lemony Snicket
 Leopold Strauss, loan shark and bookkeeper of the Van der Linde gang in the 2018 videogame Red Dead Redemption 2
 Maximilian Strauss, from the game Vampire The Masquerade: Bloodlines, one of the Primogen in Los Angeles
 Judge Robert Strauss, fictional character who presided over Carrie Mathison's competency hearing in Homeland
 Roman Strauss, fictional conductor-composer from the 1991 psychological thriller Dead Again
 Tracy Strauss, fictional character from NBC's science fiction TV series "Heroes" by Tim Kring
 The Strauss siblings, Mirajane, Elfman, and Lisanna. All three are wizards and Fairy Tail guild members from the manga Fairy Tail by Hiro Mashima

References 

Jewish surnames
German-language surnames
Yiddish-language surnames